Osborn–Bouton–Mead House is a historic home located at South Salem, Westchester County, New York.

It was added to the National Register of Historic Places in 2004.

See also
National Register of Historic Places listings in northern Westchester County, New York

References

Houses on the National Register of Historic Places in New York (state)
Colonial architecture in New York (state)
Houses completed in 1734
Houses in Westchester County, New York
National Register of Historic Places in Westchester County, New York